Events in the year 1869 in Iceland.

Incumbents 

 Monarch: Christian IX
 Council President of Denmark: Christian Emil Krag-Juel-Vind-Frijs

Events 

 Capital punishment in Iceland: The death penalty was abolished for minor offences.
 Miðdalskirkja was constructed in Mosfellsprestakalli.

Births 

 25 April − Jón Jónsson Aðils, historian

References 

 
1860s in Iceland
Years of the 19th century in Iceland
Iceland
Iceland